Statuto is Italian for statute. It is also a surname, notably of:

Art Statuto (1925–2011), American football player
Francesco Statuto (born 1971), Italian footballer and coach

See also
 Cinema Statuto fire, theater fire in Turin
 Piazza Statuto, city square in Turin
 Statuto Albertino, Sardinian constitution
 Statuto Race, annual footrace in Italy

Italian-language surnames